The women's 800 metres at the 2015 IPC Athletics World Championships was held at the Suheim Bin Hamad Stadium in Doha from 22–31 October.

Medalists

See also
List of IPC world records in athletics

References

800 metres
2015 in women's athletics
800 metres at the World Para Athletics Championships